HMS Eggesford was a Type III  of the Royal Navy. She entered service in January 1943, carrying out convoy escort, patrol and anti-shipping attacks for most of the rest of the Second World War. In 1957, she was sold to the West German Navy, serving as a training ship for the submarine weapons school until 1968.

Royal Navy Service
HMS Eggesford was one of the Type III Hunt class. These differed from the previous Type II ships in replacing a twin 4-inch gun mount by two torpedo tubes to improve their ability to operate as destroyers. During the Second World War Eggesford was awarded battle honours for Sicily 1943, Salerno 1943, Adriatic 1944 and South France 1944. In July 1945 she sailed for the Far East, but arrived too late for operational service.

At the end of 1945 Eggesford returned to Britain and was allocated to the basic anti-submarine training flotilla. In 1946 she went into reserve and in 1952 was laid up at Penarth before transfer to the West German Navy.

West German Navy service
In May 1956, Eggesford was one of seven frigates selected for transfer to the new West German Navy, being sold on 11 November 1957, and refitted in Liverpool before commissioning in the German Navy on 14 May 1959 as Brommy. In 1962 she was refitted by the Palmers Hebburn works of Vickers-Armstrong and again refitted in 1963.

Brommy decommissioned in 1968 and was sold for scrap in 1969.

References

Publications
 
 
 
 
 
 
 
 
 

 

Hunt-class destroyers of the Royal Navy
Hunt-class destroyers of the German Navy
World War II destroyers of the United Kingdom
1942 ships